Kofi Amankwa-Manu is a Ghanaian politician who is a member of the New Patriotic Party (NPP). He is the member of parliament for the Atwima-Kwanwoma Constituency in the Ashanti Region of Ghana.

Early life and education 
Amankwa-Manu was born on 11 April 1969 and hails from Atwima Foase in the Ashanti region of Ghana. He had his Ordinary Level in 1989 and his Advanced level in 1991. He further had his BSci in Banking and Finance in 2012 and his LLB in 2015.

Career 
Amankwa-Manu served in the office of the president as the Head of Impact Assessment Unit during the first term of President Nana Akufo-Addo as president of Ghana. He was the research assistant Fonaa Institute. He was also the CEO of the Waltons Limited.

Politics 
Ahead of the 2020 elections, Amankwa-Manu entered the race for the parliamentary candidate in the NPP primaries in the Atwima-Kwanwoma Constituency. In June 2020 he won the primaries for the Atwima-Kwanwoma Constituency after defeating incumbent member of parliament Kojo Appiah Kubi who had served as member of parliament for three terms and been in parliament since January 2009. He won by securing 415 votes whilst the incumbent had 69 votes.

Amankwa-Manu was elected member of parliament for Atwima-Kwanwoma in the 2020 December parliamentary elections. He was declared winner in the parliamentary elections after obtaining 78,209 votes representing 83.78% against his closest contender the National Democratic Congress' candidate Grace Agyemang Asamoah of who had 14,730 votes representing 15.78%.

Committees 
Amankwa-Manu is a member of the Gender and Children Committee and also the Food, Agriculture and Cocoa Affairs Committee.

Personal life 
Amankwa-Manu is a Christian.

References 

Living people
New Patriotic Party politicians
Ghanaian MPs 2021–2025
1969 births